Douglas Cox is a violinmaker.

Douglas Cox may also refer to:
Douglas Cox (American football) (1923–2011), American football player and coach
Douglas Cox (cricketer) (1919–1982), Australian cricketer
Douglas Cox (actor) in The Coal King
Douglas Cox (Law Professor), see Riyadh the facilitator
Douglas Cox (figure skater), see Figure skating at the Winter Universiade

See also
Doug Cox (disambiguation)